Dawn Marie Addiego (born October 20, 1962) is an American politician who represented the New Jersey's 8th legislative district in the New Jersey Senate from 2010 to 2022. A member of the Democratic Party, she previously served in the General Assembly from January 8, 2008 to November 22, 2010 as a Republican (before changing parties). On November 15, 2010, after Phil Haines was confirmed to serve on the New Jersey Superior Court for Burlington County, that county's Republican committee (of which she was still a member) nominated and appointed Addiego to fill Haines's vacant seat until the June 2011 primary and the November 2011 general election.

Early life 
Addiego graduated from Villanova University with a bachelor's degree in accounting. She earned a J.D. from Widener University School of Law in 1987. Addiego served on the Evesham Township Council from 1993 to 2000 and on its Planning Board from 1993 to 1994. She was on the Tri-County Water Quality Management Board of Advisors from 1994 to 2000. She served on the Burlington County Board of Chosen Freeholders from 2000 until 2008.

New Jersey Assembly 
While in the Assembly, Addigeo served as the Assistant Republican Whip after taking office in 2008. She also served on the Appropriations Committee and the Higher Education Committee. In March 2009, Addiego, along with fellow Assemblyman Scott Rudder, asked for a 10% cut from her legislative salary in light of New Jersey's current economic crisis.

A legal opinion from the New Jersey Office of Legislative Services found that they were the first lawmakers in New Jersey history to ask to waive part of their salary.

In 2011, the two legislators proposed that the 10% pay cut that they took should be extended to other state legislative, judicial and executive branch employees, including the Governor.

Addiego was a vocal opponent of Governor Jon Corzine's Council on Affordable Housing (COAH) plan to require towns to build a government-set number of affordable housing units. She argued that "COAH's new regulations will drive up property taxes, destroy open space and discourage economic development."

New Jersey Senate 
Addiego was elected to the New Jersey Senate in November 2011, running unopposed after prospective Democratic Party candidate Carl Lewis was knocked off the ballot because he didn't meet the state's residency requirement.

Committees 
Community and Urban Affairs 
Health, Human Services and Senior Citizens
State Government, Wagering, Tourism & Historic Preservation
Labor
Budget and Appropriations

Votes on Key Issues
 In 2012, Addiego voted against legalizing marriage for same-sex couples
 In 2017, Addiego voted to increase the New Jersey gas tax by 23 cents
 In 2018, Addiego voted against a bill requiring New Jersey employers to provide earned sick leave to their employees
 In 2019, Addiego came out against the legalization of recreational marijuana in New Jersey

Party switch 
On January 28, 2019, Addiego switched political affiliation to the Democratic Party. After Addiego's party switch, 8th District Assemblyman Joe Howarth had allegedly tried to switch his party from Republican to Democrat, and Republican leaders were unable to contact Howarth for two days. The Burlington County Republican Committee subsequently dropped their support for Howarth and endorsed Burlington County Sheriff Jean Stanfield for his seat in the Assembly. Ultimately, Stanfield and incumbent Republican Assemblyman Ryan Peters defeated Howarth in the primary and won the general election.

In 2021, Addiego ran for reelection to the Senate as a Democrat. She was  unopposed in the Democratic primary, and faced state Assemblywoman Jean Stanfield in the general election. Stanfield defeated Addiego by a narrow margin. In January 2022, it was announced that Governor Phil Murphy would appoint Addiego as Superintendent of Elections for Burlington County.

Election history

Senate

Assembly

Burlington County Commissioner

References

External links
Senator Addiego's legislative web page, New Jersey Legislature
Official 8th Legislative District website
New Jersey Legislature financial disclosure forms
2015 2014 2013 2012 2011 2010 2009 2008 2007

1962 births
Living people
New Jersey city council members
County commissioners in New Jersey
Republican Party members of the New Jersey General Assembly
Democratic Party New Jersey state senators
Republican Party New Jersey state senators
People from Evesham Township, New Jersey
Villanova University alumni
Widener University alumni
Women state legislators in New Jersey
Women city councillors in New Jersey
21st-century American politicians
21st-century American women politicians
20th-century American politicians
20th-century American women politicians